M. leoninus may refer to:
 Megalomyrmex leoninus, an ant species in the genus Megalomyrmex
 Mermessus leoninus, a spider species in the genus Mermessus

See also
 Leoninus (disambiguation)